David Demaine (born 7 May 1942) is a footballer who played as a winger in the Football League for Tranmere Rovers and Southport.

In 1965, he played in the Eastern Canada Professional Soccer League with Toronto Roma for two seasons. The remainder of the 1966 season he played in the American Soccer League with Hartford Soccer Club, and later with New York Ukrainians in the German-American Soccer League.

In 1967, he played in the National Professional Soccer League with the Toronto Falcons. In 1970, he played in the National Soccer League with the Toronto White Eagles.

References

1942 births
Living people
People from Thornton-Cleveleys
Association football wingers
English footballers
Blackpool F.C. players
Tranmere Rovers F.C. players
Southport F.C. players
GKN Sankey F.C. players
Toronto Roma players
Toronto Falcons (1967–68) players
Serbian White Eagles FC players
English Football League players
Eastern Canada Professional Soccer League players
National Professional Soccer League (1967) players
American Soccer League (1933–1983) players
German-American Soccer League players
Canadian National Soccer League players